Christie Sides (born January 17, 1977) is an American basketball head coach for the Indiana Fever of the WNBA. Sides has previously been an assistant coach for the Fever, Chicago Sky, and Atlanta Dream in the league. She has also coached at the collegiate level.

Early life and education
Sides grew up in Baton Rouge, Louisiana and attended Central Private High School. She played basketball and was named the Louisiana Gatorade Player of the Year for her senior year. She finished her high school career with 3,375 points. Following her high school career, she attended Ole Miss and Louisiana Tech. While at Louisiana Tech, Sides helped the Lady Techsters reach the 1999 Final Four.

Coaching career
Sides began her coaching career at Ruston High School as an assistant coach for the varsity team. She also served as the head JV coach for 2 season. Following that, Sides returned to her alma mater and became an assistant at Louisiana Tech. She then moved on to join Pokey Chatman's staff at LSU. While at LSU, she was apart of three Final Fours.

Following her time at LSU, Sides followed Chatman into the professional ranks, first overseas with the Spartak Moscow Region team, but then also into the WNBA level with the Chicago Sky. 

Sides went back to the NCAA level for the 2016-2017 season and joined the Northwestern Wildcats staff. She was promoted to associate head coach on May 18, 2017, but resigned from her position to join back with Chatman and become an assistant with the Indiana Fever.

She once again went back to the NCAA level following three years with the Fever. This time joining the Louisiana–Monroe staff.

She once again re-joined the WNBA ranks in 2022 - joining Tanisha Wright's staff with the Atlanta Dream.

Indiana Fever
Sides got her first head coaching job in 2022, when she was hired as the ninth head coach in Indiana Fever franchise history.

References

External links

1977 births
Living people
American women's basketball coaches
Basketball coaches from Louisiana
Basketball players from Louisiana
Chicago Sky coaches
Indiana Fever coaches
Louisiana Tech Lady Techsters basketball players
Ole Miss Rebels women's basketball players
People from Baton Rouge, Louisiana